Balasingam Singaram (15 November 1947 – 21 March 2020) was a Malaysian field hockey player. He competed at the 1972 Summer Olympics and the 1976 Summer Olympics.

References

External links
 

1947 births
2020 deaths
People from Ipoh
Malaysian people of Tamil descent
Malaysian sportspeople of Indian descent
Malaysian male field hockey players
Olympic field hockey players of Malaysia
Field hockey players at the 1972 Summer Olympics
Field hockey players at the 1976 Summer Olympics